Alper Hamurcu (born 23 November 1983) is a Turkish volleyball coach. He's been coaching Turkish side Aydın Büyükşehir Belediyespor since 2019 and also assistant coaches the Turkey women's national team.

Career

Clubs

National Team

Achievements

Club

Halkbank
  2012-13 Turkish Women's Volleyball Cup
  2012-13 Women's CEV Cup
Eczacıbaşı
  2014-15 CEV Women's Champions League
  2014-15 FIVB Volleyball Women's Club World Championship
  2015-16 FIVB Volleyball Women's Club World Championship

National Team 
Turkey
  2017 Women's European Volleyball Championship
  2018 FIVB Volleyball Women's Nations League
  2018 Mediterranean Games
  2019 Women's European Volleyball Championship

External links 
 
 CEV profile

References 

Turkish volleyball coaches
1983 births
Living people
Volleyball coaches of international teams
Eczacıbaşı S.K. volleyball coaches
Turkey women's national volleyball team coaches
Halkbank S.K. volleyball coaches